Ballygunge is a locality of South Kolkata in Kolkata district, West Bengal, India.

History
The East India Company obtained from the Mughal emperor Farrukhsiyar, in 1717, the right to rent from 38 villages surrounding their settlement. Of these 5 lay across the Hooghly in what is now Howrah district. The remaining 33 villages were on the Calcutta side.  After the fall of Siraj-ud-daulah, the last independent Nawab of Bengal, it purchased these villages in 1758 from Mir Jafar, and reorganised them. These villages were known en-bloc as Dihi Panchannagram and Ballygunge was one of them. It was considered to be a suburb beyond the limits of the Maratha Ditch. Beltala was a village in Dihi Mohanpur (later Monoharpukur).

Ballygunge grew up around a market for sand (bali in Bengali) and had garden-houses of 18th century Europeans. Amongst the prominent residents were George Mandeville, the zamindar/ collector, and Colonel Gilbert Ironside, a friend of Warren Hastings. In 1840, Emily Eden called Ballugunge 'our Eltham or Lewisham'. It also emerged as a citadel of the educated Bengali middle class after the suburban railway opened up the area.

In 1888, Ballygunge and Tollygunge had a combined thana (police station).

Entally, Manicktala, Beliaghata, Ultadanga, Chitpur, Cossipore, parts of Beniapukur, Ballygunge, Watgunge and Ekbalpur, and parts of Garden Reach and Tollygunge were added to Kolkata Municipal Corporation in 1888. Garden Reach was later taken out.

When the Bengal Renaissance started taking roots in 19th century Calcutta, it was initially limited to the predominantly Hindu 'Indian town' stretching north and north-east from the fringes of Burrabazar, with a somewhat later extension south and south-east of the 'European town' to Bhowanipore, and some decades later to Ballygunge, which was then developing as a suburb.

In the first half of the 20th century, "in the milieu of relative urban prosperity... Calcutta's rich citizens – those connected with jute, coal, tea, other industries, trade, money-lending and rentier income from urban property – did fabulously well for themselves." Large chunks of Ballygunge, Sunny Park, Rainey Park and Southern Avenue were developed during the 1930s and 1940s. Many of the mansions in Ballygunge, Bhowanipore and Alipore were built by the city's Bengali and new Marwari elite who wanted to move from the "dirtier sections of north Calcutta to the more fashionable areas in the south".

Geography

Location
Ballygunge is flanked by Park Circus in the north, Kasba and the Eastern Railway south suburban line in the east, Dhakuria and the Lakes (now called Rabindra Sarobar) in the south, and the localities of Bhowanipore and Lansdowne in the west. It is served by Ballygunge Junction railway station.

Police districts
The following police stations in the Ballygunge area, which are part of the South-east division of Kolkata Police, cover four police districts in the area:

Rabindra Sarobar police station is a new police station being set up in the Rabindra Sarobar area.

Karaya Women police station, has jurisdiction over all police districts under the jurisdiction of the South-east division, i.e. Topsia, Beniapukur, Ballygunge, Gariahat, Lake, Karaya, Rabindra Sarobar and Tiljala.

Economy

Gariahat Market
Gariahat market, spread along Rashbehari Avenue, Gariahat Road and the lanes in the area, is one of the largest and busiest markets in Kolkata. The shops sell variety of saris, clothes, jewellery, electronic goods, furniture and what not. The makeshift shops along the footpaths, popular as hawkers, sell everything  – crockery, cutlery, decorative items and utilities. It has numerous eateries and street food joints. Modern malls have also come up. Gariahat market is also well known for selling fish which is a staple for the Bengali community living in Calcutta.

Education
Ballygunge is home to some of the following educational institutions in Kolkata:

 Army Public School, Kolkata, Ballygunge Maidan Camp
 Kendriya Vidyalaya Ballygunge, Kolkata, Ballygunge Maidan Camp
 Ballygunge Government High School, Beltala
 Basanti Devi College, 147B Rash Behari Avenue, Kolkata
 Jagadbandhu Institution, 25, Fern Road, Kolkata.
 Kamala Girls' High School, Lake Road (Kavi Bharati Sarani)
 Patha Bhavan, Swinhoe Street, Ekdalia Road, Palm Avenue, Ballygunge Place and Merlin Park
 South Point School, Mandeville Gardens and Ballygunge Place
 St. Lawrence High School, Ballygunge Circular Road

People from Ballygunge

 Jyoti Basu, politician
 Buddhadeva Bose, writer
 Buddhadeb Bhattacharjee, politician
 Debabrata Biswas, Rabindra Sangeet singer
 Prosenjit Chatterjee, Bengali Film Actor 
 Sachin Dev Burman, singer
 Sarat Chandra Chatterjee, novelist
 Aroup Chatterjee, (born 1958) – British Indian atheist physician, author of Mother Teresa: The Untold Story
 Somnath Chatterjee, politician
 Jibanananda Das, poet
 Barun De, historian
 Supriya Devi, film actress, lived on Ballygunge Circular Road.
 Swarnakumari Devi, poet, musician, and social worker
 Aroti Dutt, social worker
 Gurusaday Dutt, civil servant
 Ghanshyam Das Birla, industrialist
 Sunil Gangopadhyay, writer
 Anup Ghoshal, singer
 Jaimin Rajani, singer-songwriter
 Buddhadeb Guha, novelist and poet
 Indrajit Gupta, politician
 Sheila Jasanoff
 Satyendra Chandra Mitra, politician
 Suchitra Mitra, singer
 Hemanta Mukherjee, singer
 Mani Shankar Mukherjee, writer
 Pranab Mukherjee, politician
 Subrata Mukherjee, former Mayor of Kolkata
 Subhas Mukhopadhyay, physician
 Prof. Meghnad Saha, physicist
 Nares Chandra Sen-Gupta, Bengali novelist and legal scholar
 P. C. Sorcar, Jr., magician
 Suchitra Sen, film actress lived on Ballygunge Circular Road.
 Ruma Guha Thakurta, singer
 Satyajit Ray, film-maker
 Satyendranath Tagore, civil servant

References

External links

Neighbourhoods in Kolkata